Australidelphia is the superorder that contains roughly three-quarters of all marsupials, including all those native to Australasia and a single species — the monito del monte — from South America. All other American marsupials are members of the Ameridelphia. Analysis of retrotransposon insertion sites in the nuclear DNA of a variety of marsupials has shown that the South American monito del monte's lineage is the most basal of the superorder.

The Australian australidelphians form a clade, for which the name Euaustralidelphia ("true Australidelphia") has been proposed (the branching order within this group is yet to be determined). The study also showed that the most basal of all marsupial orders are the other two South American groups (Didelphimorphia and Paucituberculata, with the former probably branching first). This indicates that Australidelphia arose in South America along with the other major divisions of extant marsupials, and likely reached Australia via Antarctica in a single dispersal event after Microbiotheria split off.

Phylogeny
Phylogeny of living Australidelphia based on the work of May-Collado, Kilpatrick & Agnarsson 2015 with extinct clades from Black et al. 2012

Taxonomy
The orders within this group are listed below:

 Genera †Djarthia Godthelp, Wroe & Archer 1999
 Order †Yalkaparidontia Archer, Hand & Godthelp 1988
 Family †Yalkaparidontidae Archer, Hand & Godthelp 1988
 ?Order Microbiotheria (1 species)
 ?Family Microbiotheriidae: monito del monte
 Order Dasyuromorphia (71 species)
 Family †Thylacinidae: thylacine
 Family Dasyuridae: antechinuses, quolls, dunnarts, Tasmanian devil, and allies
 Family Myrmecobiidae: numbat
 Order Peramelemorphia (21 species)
 Family Thylacomyidae: bilbies
 Family †Chaeropodidae: pig-footed bandicoots
 Family Peramelidae: bandicoots and allies
 Order Notoryctemorphia (2 species)
 Family Notoryctidae: marsupial moles
 Order Diprotodontia (117 species)
 Family Phascolarctidae: koala
 Family Vombatidae: wombats
 Family Phalangeridae: brushtail possums and cuscuses
 Family Burramyidae: pygmy possums
 Family Tarsipedidae: honey possum
 Family Petauridae: striped possum, Leadbeater's possum, yellow-bellied glider, sugar glider, mahogany glider, squirrel glider
 Family Pseudocheiridae: ringtailed possums and allies
 Family Potoridae: potoroos, rat kangaroos, bettongs
 Family Acrobatidae: feathertail glider and feather-tailed possum
 Family Hypsiprymnodontidae: musky rat-kangaroo
 Family Macropodidae: kangaroos, wallabies, and allies
 Family †Thylacoleonidae: marsupial lions
 Family †Palorchestidae: marsupial tapirs

 Family †Diprotodontidae: giant wombats

Footnotes

References

 
Australasian realm fauna
Mammal superorders
Extant Paleocene first appearances
Marsupials of Australia
Marsupials
Metatheria
Paleocene mammals of Australia
Paleocene mammals of Oceania